Bryoxiphium madeirense is a species of moss in the Bryoxiphiaceae family. It is endemic to the Island of Madeira in the North Atlantic, part of Portugal.

Distribution and Habitat
Bryoxiphium madeirense is endemic to Madeira Island, Portugal, with fewer than five known localities and a severely fragmented population.

References

Bryopsida
Flora of Madeira
Endemic flora of Madeira
Endangered plants
Endangered biota of Europe
Taxonomy articles created by Polbot
Plants described in 1953